Vincent Joseph Bella, known as V. J. Bella (born July 29, 1927), is a former member of the Louisiana House of Representatives for District 50 in Iberia and St. Mary parishes, whose service extended from 1972 to 1990. Thereafter, Bella served in Baton Rouge as the appointed state fire marshal from 1990 to 1992 and again from 1996 to 2004. As a representative, Bella was a pioneer in fire sprinkler legislation.

References

1927 births
Living people
Louisiana city council members
Members of the Louisiana House of Representatives
Louisiana Democrats
Louisiana Republicans
American firefighters
United States Marine Corps personnel of World War II
United States Marines
People from Berwick, Louisiana
Politicians from Baton Rouge, Louisiana
Businesspeople from Louisiana
Military personnel from Louisiana